The Vina River is a river in Cameroon. It is a tributary of the Logone River.

See also
 List of rivers of Cameroon

References

Rivers of Cameroon
North Region (Cameroon)